The Gospel of Marcion, called by its adherents the Gospel of the Lord, was a text used by the mid-2nd-century Christian teacher Marcion of Sinope to the exclusion of the other gospels. The majority of scholars agree the gospel was an edited version of the Gospel of Luke; a theory of Marcion priority does exist, although this is a minority view.

Although no manuscript of Marcion's gospel survives, scholars such as Adolf von Harnack and Dieter T. Roth have been able to largely reconstruct the text from quotations in the anti-Marcionite treatises of orthodox Christian apologists such as Irenaeus, Tertullian, and Epiphanius.

Contents 
Marcion's Gospel has been reconstructed from quotes taken from the works of others, with Tertullian contributing the most quotes and Epiphanius being the second most important source of text.
Like the Gospel of Mark, Marcion's gospel lacked any nativity story. Luke's account of the baptism of Jesus was also absent. The gospel began, roughly, as follows:
Other Lukan passages that did not appear in Marcion's gospel include the parables of the Good Samaritan and the Prodigal Son.

While Marcion preached that the God who had sent Jesus Christ was an entirely new, alien god, distinct from the vengeful God of Israel who had created the world, this view was not explicitly taught in Marcion's gospel. The Gospel of Marcion is, however, much more amenable to a Marcionite interpretation than the canonical Gospel of Luke, because it lacks many of the passages in Luke that explicitly link Jesus with Judaism, such as the parallel birth narratives of John the Baptist and Jesus in Luke 1-2.

Three hypotheses on the gospels of Marcion and Luke 
There are three hypotheses concerning the relationship between the gospel of Marcion and the gospel of Luke:

As a revision of Luke (majority view) 
Church Fathers wrote, and Bruce Metzger and Bart Ehrman agree, that Marcion edited Luke to fit his own theology, Marcionism. The late 2nd-century writer Tertullian stated that Marcion, "expunged [from the Gospel of Luke] all the things that oppose his view... but retained those things that accord with his opinion". This view, that the Gospel of Marcion was a revision of the Gospel of Luke, is the traditional view, and it is also the view of the majority of biblical scholars.

According to this view, Marcion eliminated the first two chapters of Luke concerning the nativity, and began his gospel at Capernaum making modifications to the remainder suitable to Marcionism. The differences in the texts below highlight the Marcionite view that Jesus did not follow the Prophets and that the earth is evil.

Late 19th- and early 20th-century theologian Adolf von Harnack, in agreement with the traditional account of Marcion as revisionist, theorized that Marcion believed there could be only one true gospel, all others being fabrications by pro-Jewish elements, determined to sustain worship of Yahweh; and that the true gospel was given directly to Paul the Apostle by Christ himself, but was later corrupted by those same elements who also corrupted the Pauline epistles. In this understanding, Marcion saw the attribution of this gospel to Luke the Evangelist as a fabrication, so he began what he saw as a restoration of the original gospel as given to Paul. Von Harnack wrote that:

The Catholic Encyclopedia of 1909 maintains that Justin Martyr's awareness with parts of the Gospel of Luke that were not present in Marcion's gospel indicates that the former parts were not written after Marcion produced his version of that Gospel.

Semler hypothesis and Schwegler hypothesis 
A number of biblical scholars have rejected from the traditional view that the Gospel of Marcion was a revision of the Gospel of Luke. "[T]here has been a long line of scholars" who, against what the Church Fathers said, claimed "that our canonical Luke forms an enlarged version of a 'Proto-Luke' which was also used by Marcion. This dispute [...] was especially vivid in nineteenth century German scholarship". In 1942, John Knox published his Marcion and the New Testament, defending that the gospel of Marcion had the chronological priority over Luke. After this publication, no defense of this theory was made again until two 2006 articles: one of Joseph Tyson, and one of Matthias Klinghardt.

Biblical scholars who reject the Patristic hypothesis defend either of the two hypotheses. One group argues that both gospels are independent redactions of a "proto-Luke", with Marcion's text being an unaltered version of this proto-Luke or closer to the original proto-Luke; this position is called the Semler hypothesis after the name of its creator, Johann Salomo Semler; this position is supported among others by Johann Gottfried Eichhorn, John Knox, Karl Reinhold Köstlin, Joseph B. Tyson, and Jason BeDuhn. The other group argues that the Gospel of Luke is a later redaction of the Gospel of Marcion aiming at correcting the gospel of Marcion; this position is called the Schwegler hypothesis after its creator Albert Schwegler; this position is supported among others by Albrecht Ritschl, Paul-Louis Couchoud, John Townsend, Matthias Klinghardt, Markus Vinzent, and David Trobisch.

Several arguments have been put forward in favor of those two latter views.

Firstly, there are many passages found in reconstructions of Marcion's gospel (based on comments of his detractors) that seem to contradict Marcion's own theology, which would be unexpected if Marcion was simply removing passages from Luke which he hadn't agreed with. Matthias Klinghardt has argued in 2008:

Secondly, Marcion is said to have claimed that the gospel he used was original and the canonical Luke was a falsification. The accusations of alteration are therefore mutual:

Thirdly, John Knox and Joseph Tyson have shown that, of the material that is omitted from Marcion's gospel but included in canonical Luke, the vast majority (79.5-87.2%) is unique to Luke, with no parallel in the earlier gospels of Mark and Matthew.  They argue that this result is entirely expected if canonical Luke is the result of adding new material to Marcion's gospel or its source, but that it is very much unexpected if Marcion removed material from Luke.

"In the mid-twentieth century, John Knox introduced a variation on the Semler Hypothesis that combined it with elements of the other two hypotheses [the Patristic and Schwegler]": he considers that the gospels of Luke and Marcion date back to a common source, and that the gospel of Marcion removed parts of this source, while that Luke added some parts not originally present in this source. This hypothesis was developed further by Joseph B. Tyson. Knox and Tyson also studied the Book of Acts, and "[b]oth find an anti-Marcionite intent behind the handling of Paul in Acts."

As a version of Mark 

In 2008, Matthias Klinghardt proposed that Marcion's gospel was based on the Gospel of Mark, that the Gospel of Matthew was an expansion of the Gospel of Mark with reference to the Gospel of Marcion, and that the Gospel of Luke was an expansion of the Gospel of Marcion with reference to the Gospels of Matthew and Mark. In Klinghardt's view, this model elegantly accounts for the double tradition— material shared by Matthew and Luke, but not Mark— without appealing to purely hypothetical documents, such as the Q source. In his 2015 book, Klinghardt changed his opinion compared to his 2008 article. In his 2015 book, he considers that the gospel of Marcion precedes and influenced the four gospels (Matthew, Mark, Luke, and John).

Research from 2018 suggests that the Gospel of Marcion may have been the original two-source gospel based on Q and Mark.

As the first gospel 

In his 2014 book Marcion and the Dating of the Synoptic Gospels, Markus Vinzent considers, like Klinghardt, that the gospel of Marcion precedes the four gospels (Matthew, Mark, Luke, and John). He believes that the Gospel of Marcion influenced the four gospels. Vinzent differs with both BeDuhn and Klinghardt in that he believes the Gospel of Marcion was written directly by Marcion: Marcion's gospel was first written as a draft not meant for publication which was plagiarized by the four canonical gospels; this plagiarism angered Marcion who saw the purpose of his text distorted and made him publish his gospel along with a preface (the Antithesis) and 10 letters of Paul.

The Marcion priority also implies a model of the late dating of the New Testament Gospels to the 2nd century - a thesis that goes back to David Trobisch, who, in 1996 in his habilitation thesis accepted in Heidelberg, presented the conception or thesis of an early, uniform final editing of the New Testament canon in the 2nd century.

Notes

See also
 List of Gospels
 Marcion hypothesis

References

External links 
 The Marcionite Research Library: contains a full text in English with hyperlinks to the reconstruction sources.

Further reading 
G.R.S. Mead, Fragments of a Faith Forgotten (London and Benares, 1900; 3rd edition 1931): pp. 241– 249 Introduction to Marcion
 
History of the Christian Religion to the Year Two-Hundred by Charles B. Waite: It includes a chapter where he compares Marcion and Luke
Marcion and Luke-Acts: A Defining Struggle by Joseph B. Tyson A case in favor of the view that the canonical Luke-Acts duo is a response to Marcion. Tyson also recounts the history of scholarly studies on Marcion up to 2006.

2nd-century Christian texts
Apocryphal Gospels
Gnostic Gospels
Gospel of Luke
Marcionism